Jayant R. Haritsa is an Indian computer scientist and professor. He is on the faculty of the CDS and CSA departments at Indian Institute of Science, Bangalore, India. He works on the design and analysis of Database Systems. In 2009 he won the Shanti Swarup Bhatnagar Prize sponsored by CSIR, India. In 2014 he won the Infosys Prize for Engineering.

Early life
He did his SSLC from Vijaya High School, Jayanagar, Bangalore and Pre-University in Science, from National College (Basavanagudi), Bangalore. He did his B.Tech (Electronics) from Dept. of Electrical Engineering, Indian Institute of Technology, Madras and MS and PhD (Computer Science), Computer Sciences Department, University of Wisconsin, Madison.

Career 
He became a Research Fellow in Institute for Systems Research, University of Maryland (College Park). He later became the chairman of CSA department at Indian Institute of Science.

Professional activities
 Program Co-Chair, 42nd Intl. Conf. on Very Large Data Bases, VLDB 2016, New Delhi, India
 Program Co-Chair, 26th Intl. Conf. on Data Engineering, ICDE 2010, Los Angeles, USA
 Tutorial Co-Chair, 19th Intl. World Wide Web Conference, WWW 2010, Raleigh, USA
 Editorial Board, IEEE Trans. on Knowledge and Data Engineering (TKDE), IEEE
 Editorial Board, Intl. Journal on Very Large Data Bases (VLDBJ), Springer
 Editorial Board, Intl. Journal of Distributed and Parallel Databases(JDPD), Springer
 Editorial Board, Intl. Journal of Real-Time Systems (JRTS), Springer

Honors
 Fellow of the Association for Computing Machinery, 2015
 Fellow, IEEE, 2013 
 Distinguished Alumnus, Indian Institute of Technology, Madras, India, 2012
 Fellow, Indian National Academy of Engineering (INAE), India, 2010
 Fellow, The National Academy of Sciences (NASI), India, 2006
 Shanti Swarup Bhatnagar Prize, CSIR, 2009

References

External links
Home Page

Living people
Academic staff of the Indian Institute of Science
Recipients of the Shanti Swarup Bhatnagar Prize for Science and Technology
Fellows of the Association for Computing Machinery
Fellow Members of the IEEE
Database researchers
Indian computer scientists
IIT Madras alumni
Scientists from Bangalore
Fellows of the Indian National Academy of Engineering
Year of birth missing (living people)
Recipients of the Shanti Swarup Bhatnagar Award in Engineering Science